Murray Bedel is a Canadian para-alpine skier. He represented Canada at the 1984 Winter Paralympics in alpine skiing.

He won the bronze medal in the Men's Slalom LW5/7 event.

He also competed in the Men's Downhill LW5/7 and Men's Giant Slalom LW5/7 events.

See also 
 List of Paralympic medalists in alpine skiing

References 

Living people
Year of birth missing (living people)
Place of birth missing (living people)
Paralympic alpine skiers of Canada
Alpine skiers at the 1984 Winter Paralympics
Medalists at the 1984 Winter Paralympics
Paralympic bronze medalists for Canada
Paralympic medalists in alpine skiing